A Tysiatskii ("thousandman"), sometimes translated dux or herzog, was a military leader in ancient Rus' who commanded a people's volunteer army called a thousand. In the Novgorod Republic, the tysyatskii evolved into a judicial or commercial official and was elected from boyars at a veche for a period of one year.  In cities with no veche, tysyatskiis were appointed by the knyaz or prince from among the noble boyars and could hand down their post to their sons.

In the Novgorod Republic, tysyatskiis were considered representatives of ordinary people. Along with the role as military leaders, they were also supposed to supervise the city fortifications, convene veches, act as ambassadors and as judges in the commercial courts.  Like the posadniks, the office was often held by one man for several years in a row and he was often succeeded by his son or another close relative, indicating that the office was held within clans and was not fully elective. In the 14th century the former tysyatskiis maintained considerable political influence and privileges and were known as Old Tysyatskiis. The earliest documented tysyatskii of Novgorod was Putyata.

Dmitry Donskoy, Grand Prince of Moscow, abolished the post after the death of Vassilii Vassilievich Veliaminov in 1374, replacing it with voyevodas and namestniks. The Novgorod tysyatskii was abolished when Ivan III conquered the city for Muscovy in 1478, and the same happened in Pskov when Vasili III conquered it in 1510.

Notes

References
Notes

Sources
George Vernadsky. A History of Russia. (Yale University Press, 1969).

External links 
 Tysyatsky in Novgorod - Article in Brockhaus and Efron Encyclopedic Dictionary
 Tysyatsky in Kiev and Moscow Rus - Article in Brockhaus and Efron Encyclopedic Dictionary

Novgorod Republic
Titles
Military ranks of Russia
Local government in Russia
History of the Rus' people